Orsamus S. Barnes (August 7, 1830March 17, 1916) was a Michigan politician.

Early life
Barnes was born on August 7, 1830, in Broome County, New York. In 1839, he moved to Oberlin, Ohio, due to the breaking up of his father's family. In Ohio, he lived with some siblings and other relatives and attended school for a year. In February 1846, he moved to Wisconsin.

Military career
On August 16, 1847, Barnes enlisted in the United States Army in Milwaukee to fight in the Mexican–American War. He was a part of the 15th Infantry Regiment. Of the 136 men in his company, he was one of only 26 survivors. He returned to Wisconsin at the end of the war.

Career and education
Barnes lived in Wisconsin for about seven more years. There, he attended common school, taught classes, and worked at wagon shops. In the spring of 1855, Barnes returned to Oberlin, and continued his education there. In 1860, Barnes moved to Lenawee County, Michigan. In 1863, he moved to Eaton County, Michigan. In Michigan, he was a farmer. He held nearly every type of township office, including supervisor and constable. Barnes was a Republican ever since the party formed. On November 5, 1878, Barnes was elected to the Michigan House of Representatives, where he represented the Eaton County 2nd district from January 1, 1879, to December 31, 1880.

Personal life
During his second time in Oberlin, Barnes met Elvira L. Spooner. On February 19, 1857, Barnes and Spooner married in Oberlin. Together they had two children. Barnes was a Church of Christ minister.

Death
Barnes died on March 17, 1916, in Girard, Kansas.

References

1830 births
1916 deaths
American members of the Churches of Christ
American military personnel of the Mexican–American War
Farmers from Michigan
Republican Party members of the Michigan House of Representatives
Michigan local politicians
Military personnel from Wisconsin
Ministers of the Churches of Christ
People from Broome County, New York
People from Eaton County, Michigan
People from Lenawee County, Michigan
People from Oberlin, Ohio
People from Wisconsin
19th-century American politicians
19th-century United States Army personnel